Earle is a village and civil parish in county of Northumberland, England. It is a popular walking area with many walks passing through Earle on their way to the Cheviot Hills.

Governance 
Earle  is in the parliamentary constituency of Berwick-upon-Tweed.

References

External links

 History of Earle

Villages in Northumberland
Civil parishes in Northumberland